Sindre Tjelmeland (born 13 September 1989) is a Norwegian football manager. He is currently manager for Start.

Tjelmeland hails from Etne and started playing as a child in Etne IL. He also made his senior debut, and helped win promotion from the sixth to the fifth tier. In 2005 he moved to attend upper secondary school in Haugesund, and played for the U19 team of FK Haugesund. Before finishing school, he opted to play for the senior team of Vard. He did not break through there, and instead featured for Etne in the autumn of 2008.

He then did his military service in Stavanger and was contracted to IL Havørn, but moved to Bergen to study at the Norwegian School of Economics. Here he was quickly introduced to the local football milieu. Following stints in Sandviken and Arna-Bjørnar—with the latter club he won promotion and played in the 2013 2. divisjon—he moved to Åsane, managed by Kjetil Knutsen. Åsane won promotion from the 2014 2. divisjon, whereupon Tjelmeland felt his playing career was fulfilled, and withdrew from the team. He was however asked by Knutsen to pursue a manager career.

Tjelmeland successively became U16 coach, U19 coach and player developer in Åsane while taking the UEFA A Licence. While coaching, Tjelmeland briefly played matches for his old clubs Arna-Bjørnar and Etne. In November 2020 he stated his amibition as to become manager of FK Haugesund.

In 2019 and 2020 he was Åsane's assistant manager under Morten Røssland. In 2021 he was given his first head coach position in Ull/Kisa of the second tier. However, after only 5 games of the season, he was bought out of his contract and signed by newly relegated IK Start.

Tjelmeland is known for an "Åsane style" of play, with high ball possession. He has gotten a reputation for high dedication. When signing for Ull/Kisa, the managing director of the club called him "a young and completely crazy coach". To Fædrelandsvennen, he stated: "I am a nerd, though. I have somewhat autistic tendencies when it comes to football".

He had his first child in 2020, together with Gunnhild Øvernes, a sister of football goalkeeper Lars Øvernes. He graduated from the Norwegian School of Economics in economics.

References

1989 births
Living people
People from Etne
Norwegian School of Economics alumni
Norwegian footballers
SK Vard Haugesund players
IL Sandviken men's players
Arna-Bjørnar men's players
Åsane Fotball players
Norwegian Second Division players
Norwegian football managers
Ullensaker/Kisa IL managers
IK Start managers